The Adams Woodframe Grain Elevator is a grain elevator in Adams, Oklahoma. The elevator was built in 1926, the same year the community of Adams was established by the Tex-Co Grain Company. The Chicago, Rock Island and Pacific Railroad (Rock Island) opened a line past the grain elevator in 1929, which linked Amarillo, Texas to Liberal, Kansas. The elevator has mainly held wheat, the primary crop in the area, and operated continuously from its opening to at least 1983. The grain was shipped by railroad from Adams to markets in either Fort Worth, Texas or Galveston, Texas On May 13, 1983, the elevator was added to the National Register of Historic Places.  It was burned down around August 22, 2018 because of safety issues.

Description
It has a wood frame and is covered with corrugated metal siding, which is attached to horizontal wood support beams that run from grade level to the gable roof line. The roof is also covered with corrugated sheet metal. The east side faces the railroad track and has a single door entrance at grade. There is a loading spout and two windows, one above the other, in the loft. Two one-story sheds are attached to the south elevation. The smaller shed has a double sliding door and was used for storing equipment. The larger has a double, swinging door, and leads into the area where grain was unloaded from wagons and trucks. The west elevation looks like the east, except that it has no loading spout. The north elevation has a double, sliding exit door and four windows (two pairs, one above the other).

Gradual destruction
In 2017, a news story reported that the old grain elevator has developed a noticeable lean toward the north, because of the prairie wind. Apparently this has occurred since the 1980s, when the Rock Island removed its track and a grain truck fell through the elevator floor. The structure is officially condemned as of 2017.  It was burned down about August 22, 2018.

Notes

References

Agricultural buildings and structures on the National Register of Historic Places in Oklahoma
Industrial buildings completed in 1926
Buildings and structures in Texas County, Oklahoma
Grain elevators in Oklahoma
National Register of Historic Places in Texas County, Oklahoma